In computer networking, resilience is the ability to "provide and maintain an acceptable level of service in the face of faults and challenges to normal operation." Threats and challenges for services can range from simple misconfiguration over large scale natural disasters to targeted attacks. As such, network resilience touches a very wide range of topics. In order to increase the resilience of a given communication network, the probable challenges and risks have to be identified and appropriate resilience metrics have to be defined for the service to be protected. 

The importance of network resilience is continuously increasing, as communication networks are becoming a fundamental component in the operation of critical infrastructures. Consequently, recent efforts focus on interpreting and improving network and computing resilience with applications to critical infrastructures. As an example, one can consider as a resilience objective the provisioning of services over the network, instead of the services of the network itself. This may require coordinated response from both the network and from the services running on top of the network.

These services include:
 supporting distributed processing
 supporting network storage
 maintaining service of communication services such as
 video conferencing
 instant messaging
 online collaboration
 access to applications and data as needed

Note that resilience and survivability are interchangeably used according to the specific context of a given study.

See also
Availability
Fault tolerance

References

Computer networks